Christopher James Kluwe (born December 24, 1981) is a former American football punter and writer. Kluwe played at Los Alamitos High School in Los Alamitos, California, where he was a 1999 USA Today High School All-American, and then attended the University of California, Los Angeles (UCLA), where he played college football for the UCLA Bruins. He was signed by the Seattle Seahawks as an undrafted free agent in 2005 and played professionally in the National Football League for the Seahawks, Minnesota Vikings, and Oakland Raiders.

Kluwe is widely known for his eight seasons with the Minnesota Vikings, where he set eight individual team records. During this period, Kluwe became an outspoken advocate on social issues, including same sex marriage and gay rights, which ultimately led to tension between Kluwe and coaching staff.

Kluwe was released by the Vikings after the 2012 season, signed with the Oakland Raiders prior to the 2013 season, and was subsequently released. Kluwe was unable to find another NFL team with which to sign and retired from professional football in 2013. Following his departure from football, he has pursued a writing career and was a humor columnist for the sports website Deadspin.

Early career

High school
Kluwe played three years of varsity football for coach John Barnes at Los Alamitos High School in Los Alamitos, California and was selected to play in both the California-Texas Shrine game (where he kicked a 57-yard game-winning field goal with no time left) and the CaliFlorida Bowl. He also made the USA Today first-team All-American as a punter. He kicked an Orange County and CIF Playoff record 60-yard field goal vs. Loyola to force overtime in an eventual 30–23 victory. Averaging 46.6 yards as a punter, he had 10 punts of at least 60 yards and placed six kicks inside the 10-yard line. As a placekicker, he made 16 of 22 field goal attempts and 39 of 41 PATs. Prior to his senior year, he won the punting competition at the National Kicking Invitational with a 63-yard punt that had 4.98 seconds of hang time. Kluwe also played one year of baseball as a pitcher.

College
Kluwe enrolled at the University of California, Los Angeles (UCLA), where he developed into one of the top punters in the Pac-10 Conference. He graduated in 2005 with a double major in political science and history. He set school records for both total punt yardage and total number of punts in a season in 2003. In his senior year, he ranked 3rd in the Pac-10 and 12th in the NCAA in yards per punt (43.4). He was selected as special teams player of the game in the Silicon Valley Football Classic against Fresno State after averaging 44.3 yards on nine kicks. He also tied the bowl record with his nine punts and placed three kicks inside the 20-yard line.  Kluwe was a finalist in his senior year for the Ray Guy Award that annually recognizes the best collegiate punter.

NFL career

Seattle Seahawks
Kluwe was signed as an undrafted free agent by the Seattle Seahawks in 2005. Kluwe had been notified by both the Seahawks and St. Louis Rams that either team might draft him in the late rounds. As soon as the draft ended, Kluwe signed a free agent contract with Seattle. Kluwe had an excellent training camp with Seattle, to the point where Donnie Jones was released after the first week of Organized Team Activities, and Kluwe and Tom Rouen split time during the pre-season games for punting duties. Kluwe was told by the Seahawks prior to the final pre-season game they were going to take him to the practice squad as Rouen had a history over the prior three seasons of going on injured reserve during the season and the Seahawks wanted Kluwe both as a potential back-up and for developmental reasons. Due to NFL rules, the Seahawks had to place Kluwe on the waiver wire for 24 hours prior to signing him to a practice squad contract. The Seahawks waited until the last minute to place Kluwe on the waiver wire as they knew three teams had been scouting Kluwe as a potential punter for their team. The Seahawks concerns were well founded as Kluwe was claimed off the waiver wire early the next day by the Vikings.

Minnesota Vikings
Kluwe became one of the most surprising pickups for the Vikings, finishing his first season with an average of 44.1 yards per punt, ranking second in the NFC and sixth in the league. He punted 71 times during his first season.  Kluwe was also named NFC special teams player of the month for September 2005 – a first for any Vikings special teams rookie.

During a Week-13 game in Detroit, Lions safety Vernon Fox dove towards Kluwe during a punt and collided with Kluwe's plant foot. Although initial concerns were that Kluwe had a broken ankle, tests showed Kluwe had a sprained ankle. What the tests did also show was that earlier in the game when the ball was snapped over Kluwe's head and he had to make a running and jumping rugby style kick to avoid being blocked, he tore his right ACL when he landed after the kick.  Kicker Paul Edinger was the punter for the remainder of the game, but a few days later the Vikings signed 42-year-old veteran Darren Bennett for 1 week.  Kluwe then returned to play the final 3 games of the 2005 season with a torn ACL in his kicking leg, which prompted his then coach Mike Tice to reply to a reporter's question about Kluwe's injury that "My punter is a tough guy."  As Tice was not known to be sympathetic towards punters and kickers, this showed the amount of respect he had for Kluwe's willingness to play with a serious injury.  During the 2006 off-season Kluwe had arthroscopic surgery on his right knee to repair the ACL. The operation was successful and Kluwe returned to the Vikings in full health for the 2006 season.

On October 25, 2007, Kluwe signed an $8.3-million contract extension through 2013. The deal made Kluwe, who would have been a restricted free agent in the 2008 offseason, one of the 10 highest-paid punters in the NFL.

On December 20, 2010, Kluwe had the dubious distinction of punting the ball that the Chicago Bears' Devin Hester would return for a touchdown, breaking the all-time NFL record for combined punt and kickoff returns for touchdowns.  Previously in the game, Kluwe had successfully kept the ball out of Hester's hands on four punts.

In 2011, Kluwe changed his jersey number when the Vikings acquired quarterback Donovan McNabb. McNabb previously wore #5 for the Washington Redskins and Philadelphia Eagles, and requested the same number when he arrived in Minnesota, which was then being worn by Kluwe. Kluwe agreed on the condition that McNabb make a $5,000 donation to charity, to mention Kluwe's band Tripping Icarus a total of 5 times during McNabb's press conferences, and to buy Kluwe an ice cream cone. Kluwe took up #4 which had been worn by quarterback Brett Favre in 2009 and 2010.  Following McNabb's departure from the team, Kluwe reclaimed his old #5 for the 2012 season.  McNabb did mention Kluwe's band 3 times and did write the check for the donation, but didn't buy Kluwe the ice cream cone until 5 years later.

After a poor performance in an October 25, 2012 game against the Tampa Bay Buccaneers, the Vikings brought in several punters for workouts to potentially replace Kluwe. Kluwe had been playing since 2007 with a torn meniscus. His discomfort caused by the condition late in 2012 led to him deciding to have surgery during the offseason. In January 2013, the team signed punter T.J. Conley to a futures contract. Kluwe finished the 2012 season with an average of 45.0 yards per punt, ranking tenth in the NFC and 22nd in the league.

Kluwe had arthroscopic surgery on his left knee to repair a torn meniscus in early 2013.  Recovery was uneventful and Kluwe was back to full health in a matter of weeks.  During the 2013 NFL draft, the Vikings drafted Jeff Locke (UCLA) in the 5th round of the draft as a punter.  Speculation immediately surfaced that Kluwe's days were numbered with the Vikings due to the use of a relatively high draft round pick for a punter.  On May 6, 2013, Kluwe was released by the Minnesota Vikings.

Vikings team records
Kluwe holds a number of team punt records for the Minnesota Vikings (see list below).
 #1 Career Punt Avg., 44.4, 2005–2012
 #1 Game Punt Avg., 54.3, 2005
 #1 Rookie Game Punt Avg., 54.3, 2005
 #1 Career Playoff Punt Avg., 45.2, 2005–2012
 #1 Average Punts per Season, 78, 2005–2012
 #1 Career Punts Inside 20, 198, 2005–2012
 #1, #2, #5 Season Punts Inside 20, 34 / 32 / 28, 2007 / 2010 / 2006
 #1 Game Punts Inside 20, 5, 2007
 #8 (tied) Career Blocked Punts, 1, 2005–2012
 #2 Career Punts, 623, 2005–2012
 #2 Rookie Season Punts, 71, 2005
 #2 Season Fewest Touchbacks, 2, 2012
 #2 Career Net Yds. Avg., 37.2, 2005–2012
 #2, #4 Season Net Yds. Avg., 39.7 / 38.9, 2012 / 2010

Oakland Raiders
Kluwe signed with the Oakland Raiders on May 15, 2013, less than two weeks after being released by the Vikings.  Kluwe signed for a veteran minimum contract for one year. Kluwe was given his old number (#5) by the Raiders and competed with Marquette King for the position of punter.  Kluwe expressed thanks to the Raiders for picking him up and stated that, "I am glad to be a Raider and playing back in California, where I grew up." On September 1, Kluwe tweeted that he had been released by the Raiders.

Retirement
On January 3, 2014, Kluwe retired from football. After a year of not playing, he did not want to attempt playing in the NFL again, and believed his chances were slim given his outspoken views of same-sex marriage and criticism of the Vikings.

Activism

2011 NFL lockout
During the 2011 NFL lockout, the Boston Globe reported that an agreement between owners and the players' union was being held up by special considerations for a few top employees, Peyton Manning, Drew Brees, Vincent Jackson, and Logan Mankins. Kluwe tweeted his frustration at this impasse, assailing their greed and calling them "douchebags."

After Nate Jackson wrote an article for the sport website Deadspin, excoriating Kluwe for talking "out of turn," Kluwe responded with his own article, highlighting the contrast between his own fruitful career and Jackson's lack of statistics, while reiterating his opinion that four people endangering the livelihoods of the 1,900 affected by the dispute was "pretty much the definition of greed."

Same-sex marriage

Kluwe publicly released a letter on September 7, 2012, via sports website Deadspin he had sent to Maryland state assembly delegate Emmett Burns, defending the opinions of Baltimore Ravens linebacker Brendon Ayanbadejo and condemning Burns on his attempt to stifle Ayanbadejo's free speech. Ayanbadejo has been a vocal supporter of same-sex marriage and Burns had sent a letter requesting that the Ravens ownership "inhibit such expressions" by their employee. On October 1, 2012, Kluwe published a letter to the editor that responded to a video statement released by former Viking Matt Birk in supporting a ban on same-sex marriage. In the letter, Kluwe outlined six primary reasons why he disagreed with Birk's statement. Kluwe was also featured in a documentary called The Last Barrier which aired on NBC Bay Area on December 8, 2012. During this interview he spoke about his feelings towards equality.

Kluwe and Ayanbadejo filed an amicus brief to the United States Supreme Court on February 28, 2013, regarding Hollingsworth v. Perry, in which they expressed their support of the challenge to California Proposition 8. Kluwe appeared on the January 18, 2013, episode of The Ellen DeGeneres Show, to discuss his support of same-sex marriage. Ellen DeGeneres inducted Kluwe as the first inductee in her Hall of Fame, since NFL punters are unlikely to be voted into the league's hall of fame. On April 16, 2013, in recognition of his steadfast support of same-sex marriage and for starting a conversation about LGBT issues in athletics, Kluwe was named the Grand Marshal of the 41st annual Twin Cities Pride festival in Minneapolis, Minnesota.

On January 2, 2014, Kluwe claimed he had been released from the Vikings due to his support of same-sex marriage. He stated that the Vikings requested that he "deliberately sacrifice my own numbers to help the team, a request with which I always complied." The team stated it was not previously made aware of Kluwe's allegations, and countered that he "was released strictly based on his football performance." Kluwe claimed that in 2012 special teams coach Mike Priefer had made homophobic remarks and criticized Kluwe's views on same-sex marriage. Priefer responded with a statement saying that "I do not tolerate discrimination of any type and am respectful of all individuals. I personally have gay family members who I love and support just as I do any family member.” Kluwe called the coach's acts "inexcusable", and hoped he prevented Priefer from ever coaching again. He also claimed head coach Leslie Frazier told him to stop speaking out on same-sex marriage. Kluwe later acknowledged that his comments on Priefer were "a little too harsh originally", and stated that he preferred that the coach get therapy and counseling and return to the league as a role model.

On January 3, 2014, the Vikings announced that an investigation of the allegations would be performed by former Chief Justice of the Minnesota Supreme Court Eric Magnuson and former U.S. Department of Justice Trial Attorney Chris Madel. On January 26, Kluwe's lawyer stated that at least two witnesses confirmed the homophobic remarks were made and that a Vikings official was aware of those remarks prior to the team's releasing Kluwe. In May, Madel said the completion of the investigation could be delayed until June due to an uncooperative unnamed key witness. In August 2014, Kluwe and the Vikings settled for an undisclosed donation to organizations serving LGBT causes.

Pro Football Hall of Fame
During a December 2012 game against Chicago Bears, Kluwe covered the Pro Football Hall of Fame patch on his uniform with a post-it note with a message "Vote Ray Guy" as a protest against the Hall's 50th Anniversary celebrations due to the lack of pure punters in the Hall.  Kluwe was fined $5,250 for a uniform violation by the NFL. In 2014, Guy was voted into the Hall of Fame.

Personal life
Kluwe and his wife Isabel had their first daughter in July 2008, and their second in 2010.  He also wrote a blog named "Out of Bounds," which appeared on the website of the St. Paul Pioneer Press until 2012. He quit the column in protest after the paper published an editorial in support of the Minnesota Marriage Amendment which would have amended the state constitution to ban same-sex marriage: Kluwe was not surprised at the paper's position itself, but felt that the editorial was derogatory to amendment opponents while feigning neutrality.

Kluwe is an avid Guitar Hero 2 player, having once made an appearance on Minnesota's 93X radio station while playing the game with Andy McNamara from Game Informer magazine. He is a frequent guest on Minnesota sports station KFAN for "Video Games Weekly" on Wednesday nights. During a KFAN interview on the PA and Dubay show, he admitted he was not very good at sports games.

Kluwe at one time immersed himself in the MMORPG World of Warcraft, playing a troll rogue named Loate and has been a member of one of the formerly top-ranked US guilds, The Flying Hellfish, for over four years.

Kluwe appeared in a video promoting the MOBA League of Legends, stating that he plays the AD Carry position, and that his favorite champion to play in the game is Vayne. He described how he believes that eSports is a "burgeoning culture of actual sports," and believes it will only continue to grow into a legitimate sports scene, based on low barrier to entry, entertainment value of watching professional players, team-based engagement, and continued social acceptance. He has a Sniper class, hero level character named in his honor in XCOM: Enemy Within, an expansion to XCOM: Enemy Unknown.  He won this honor after defeating Firaxis producer and designer Garth DeAngelis in a best-of-three series of online matches of XCOM.

Kluwe describes himself as "cheerfully agnostic." Despite stating he is "confused" by atheism, Kluwe agreed to speak at the 2014 American Atheists Convention. Politically he considers himself a libertarian.

Kluwe created the unique weapon The Poet's Pen Carved Wand for the game Path of Exile.

Other ventures

Music
In addition to being a punter in the NFL, Kluwe is the bassist for the local Minneapolis alternative/progressive metal band, Tripping Icarus. Kluwe formed the band in 2009 with friends Andrew Reiner (guitar) and Matthew Marshall (drums), and later recruited Jesse Revel to join on lead vocals.  Tripping Icarus recorded their debut EP, The Sideshow Sessions, in the summer of 2009.  A year later, they recorded their first full-length LP, Perfect Citizen, which was slated for an early 2011 release. Their producer Andrew Lindberg was killed in a car accident May 2010. Tripping Icarus threw a memorial concert at Minneapolis’ First Avenue. When Donovan McNabb was traded to Minnesota before the 2011 season, Kluwe offered McNabb the number 5 jersey in exchange for mentioning Tripping Icarus in at least five press conferences, as well as donating $5,000 to Kluwe's charity, and an ice cream cone. McNabb didn't mention the band in five separate press conferences, but Kluwe concedes that "in his very first press conference, he mentioned it like twelve times".

Writing
Kluwe has written a book, Beautifully Unique Sparkleponies (Little Brown & Co.), that was released on June 25, 2013.  The book is a collection of essays on various topics and the book title comes from the public consumption version of Kluwe's Deadspin letter to Maryland General Assembly Del. Emmett Burns.  Kluwe also cowrote a book with Andrew Reiner, entitled "Prime: A Genesis Series Event (Volume 1)". The book is the first in a planned science-fiction trilogy. His first novel written solo, Otaku, was published by Tor in March 2020.

Tabletop gaming
Kluwe released his first tabletop game called Twilight of the Gods on August 31, 2017, published by Victory Point Games.

Coaching
Kluwe was hired as the Special Teams Coach at Edison High School (Huntington Beach, California) for the 2017 season.

References

External links
 Oakland Raiders bio
 

1981 births
21st-century American bass guitarists
21st-century American male writers
21st-century American male musicians
Activists from California
Alternative rock bass guitarists
American agnostics
American alternative rock musicians
American football punters
American libertarians
American male bass guitarists
American male bloggers
American bloggers
American rock bass guitarists
American sportsmen
American talk radio hosts
Guitarists from Minnesota
American LGBT rights activists
Living people
Minnesota Vikings players
Oakland Raiders players
People from Los Alamitos, California
Players of American football from California
Players of American football from Philadelphia
Progressive rock guitarists
Radio personalities from Minnesota
Seattle Seahawks players
Sportspeople from Orange County, California
UCLA Bruins football players
Writers from California